Mark Budz (born November 1, 1960, Cherry Hill, New Jersey) is an American science fiction writer. Although he began by writing short stories, his novels such as Clade and Crache have been nominated for major awards.

Personal life
Budz was born on November 1, 1960, in Cherry Hill, New Jersey into a family that traveled prodigiously because his father worked for the National Park Service, living in Arizona, California, and Colorado. In 1982, Budz graduated from the University of Colorado at Boulder with a bachelor's degree in architectural engineering. After graduating, he worked at several different jobs, including as a sales at manufacturer's representative for ITT Bell & Gossett, in retail sales, as a publisher's reader for a small press, and technical support. Currently, Budz is a technical writer for a software company near Silicon Valley.

In the late 1980s, Budz moved to Eugene, Oregon, to attempt to become a full-time writer, beginning with short stories. Although becoming a short story writer did not work out, he decided to become a novel writer, which began with his first novel Clade in 2003. In subsequent years, he published other novels such as Crache and Idolon.

In 1991, he met his future wife, Marina Fitch, and in 1992 they moved to Watsonville, California.

Publications

Novels
 Clade (2003)
 Crache (2004)
 Idolon (2006)
 Till Human Voices Wake Us (2007)

Short stories
 Toy Soldiers
 Zinnias on the Moon
 Roatan
 The War Inside

Awards
 Philip K. Dick Award nominee - In 2003, Clade was a nominee for the Philip K. Dick Award.
 Andre Norton Award - In 2004, Mark Budz won the second annual Norton Award for his novel Clade.

References

External links
 Mark Budz homepage

1960 births
Living people
21st-century American novelists
American male novelists
American science fiction writers
People from Cherry Hill, New Jersey
Writers from Eugene, Oregon
People from Watsonville, California
University of Colorado alumni
American male short story writers
21st-century American short story writers
21st-century American male writers
Novelists from California
Novelists from Oregon